Jackson Barreto de Lima (born May 6, 1944) is a Brazilian lawyer, politician, and member of the PMDB. Barreto has served as the Governor of Sergipe since December 2, 2013, following the death of his predecessor, Governor Marcelo Déda, who died in office.

He served as a Sergipe state deputy from 1975 to 1978. Barreto also served as the Mayor of Aracaju, the state's largest city, from 1986 to 1988 and again from 1993 to 1994.

Barreto won re-election for a full term as governor in the Sergipe gubernatorial election on October 5, 2014. Governor Barreto received 53.51% of the vote, while his closest opponent, Eduardo Amorim of the PSC, placed second with 41.33% of the vote.

See also
 List of mayors of Aracaju

References

Living people
1944 births
Governors of Sergipe
Members of the Chamber of Deputies (Brazil) from Sergipe
Brazilian Democratic Movement politicians
People from Aracaju
Members of the Legislative Assembly of Sergipe